James Parris (15 December 1905 – 29 May 1997) was a Barbadian cricketer. He played in fifteen first-class matches for the Barbados cricket team from 1925 and 1947.

See also
 List of Barbadian representative cricketers

References

External links
 

1905 births
1997 deaths
Barbadian cricketers
Barbados cricketers
People from Saint Michael, Barbados